The Lordly Ones is a collection by Keith Roberts published in 1986.

Plot summary
The Lordly Ones is a collection of 7 stories, four science fiction, 2 fantasy, and one ghost story.

Reception
Dave Langford reviewed The Lordly Ones for White Dwarf #84, and stated that "Only Roberts could write a moving and horrowing post-holocaust tale set in a public lavatory... and then write another. Recommended."

Reviews
Review by Chris Morgan (1986) in Fantasy Review, November 1986
Review by Mike Moir (1986) in Vector 135
Review by David V. Barrett (1987) in Vector 138

References

1986 novels